Stefania Rubini (born 5 December 1992) is an Italian tennis player.

She has career-high WTA rankings of 293 in singles, achieved on 15 October 2018, and 772 in doubles, set on 1 October 2012.

Rubini made her WTA Tour main-draw debut at the 2017 Italian Open in the doubles draw, partnering Deborah Chiesa; they lost their first-round match against Jelena Janković and Andrea Petkovic.

Rubini won her first ITF title in 2015 in Velenje, Slovenia.

ITF Circuit finals

Singles: 12 (7 titles, 5 runner–ups)

Doubles: 2 (2 runner–ups)

References

External links
 
 

1992 births
Living people
Italian female tennis players
21st-century Italian women